The Conductor's Departure is Anata's fourth full-length album. It was released by Earache Records.

Track listing

Personnel
 Fredrik Schälin – vocals, guitar
 Andreas Allenmark – guitar
 Henrik Drake – bass
 Conny Pettersson – drums

References

2006 albums
Anata (band) albums
Earache Records albums